Inverted formin-2 is a protein that in humans is encoded by the INF2 gene. It belongs to the protein family called the formins. It has two splice isoforms, CAAX which localizes to the endoplasmic reticulum and non-CAAX which localizes to focal adhesions and the cytoplasm with enrichment at the Golgi.  INF2 plays a role in mitochondrial fission and dorsal stress fiber formation. INF2 accelerates actin nucleation and elongation by interacting with barbed ends (fast-growing ends) of actin filaments, but also accelerates disassembly of actin through encircling and severing filaments.

Clinical significance 

It can be associated with Focal segmental glomerulosclerosis and Charcot-Marie Tooth Disease.

References

Further reading 

 
 
 
 
 
 

Human proteins